Ruth Trinidad Hernández Martínez (born 17 June 1962) is a Mexican politician affiliated with the National Action Party. As of 2014 she served as Deputy of the LIX Legislature of the Mexican Congress as a plurinominal representative.

References

1962 births
Living people
Politicians from Baja California
Women members of the Chamber of Deputies (Mexico)
Members of the Chamber of Deputies (Mexico)
National Action Party (Mexico) politicians
Deputies of the LIX Legislature of Mexico
Universidad Iberoamericana alumni
21st-century Mexican politicians
21st-century Mexican women politicians